The Sky Is Falling is an album by Randy Stonehill, released in 1980, on Solid Rock Records.

Track listing
All songs written by Randy Stonehill.

Original, US vinyl release

Side one
 "One True Love"  – 4:10
 "Through The Glass Darkly"  – 5:50
 "Teen King"  – 4:25
 "The Great American Cure"  – 4:00
 "Venezuela"  – 6:50

Side two
 "Counterfeit King"  – 5:30
 "Jamey's Got The Blues"  – 4:00
 "Bad Fruit"  – 4:55
 "Emily"  – 5:40
 "Trouble Coming"  – 4:50

1994 CD reissue 
The 1994 CD reissue is of the 1980 European version, with tracks 9-13 as bonus tracks not included on the original European version.
 "One True Love"  – 4:17
 "Bad Fruit"  – 5:08
 "Jamey's Got The Blues"  – 4:08
 "Through The Glass Darkly"  – 5:53
 "The Great American Cure"  – 3:59
 "Venezuela"  – 7:01
 "Emily"  – 5:41
 "Trouble Coming"  – 4:48
 "Counterfeit King" (alternate mix)  – 5:16
 "Teen King" (alternate mix)  – 4:42
 "Postcards From The Heart (Letter To My Family)"  - 5:19
 "King Of Hearts" (the orchestral version)  - 3:14
 "Good News" (Live From Greenbelt)  - 4:54

2004 CD reissue 
Larry Norman released the album in the original order on CD in 2004, but substituting the alternative mixes of "Teen King" and "Counterfeit King". It also included the three bonus tracks from the 1994 release.

 "One True Love"  – 4:17
 "Through The Glass Darkly"  – 5:53
 "Teen King" (alternate mix)  – 4:42
 "The Great American Cure"  – 3:59
 "Venezuela"  – 7:01
 "Counterfeit King" (alternate mix)  – 5:16
 "Jamey's Got The Blues"  – 4:08
 "Bad Fruit"  – 5:08
 "Emily"  – 5:41
 "Trouble Coming"  – 4:48
 "Postcards From The Heart (Letter To My Family)"  - 5:19
 "King Of Hearts" (the orchestral version)  - 3:14
 "Good News" (Live From Greenbelt)  - 4:54

Personnel 
 Randy Stonehill – lead vocals, harmony vocals, electric guitars, acoustic guitars
 Tom Howard – acoustic piano, keyboards, Moog synthesizer, orchestrations
 Larry Norman – acoustic piano, electric guitars, acoustic guitars, autoharp, koto, harmonica, electric bass, marimba, steel drums, harmony vocals 
 Jon Linn – electric guitars, slide guitar, volume control guitar and fiery fingers
 Bill Batstone – bass 
 Dave Coy – bass 
 Peter Johnson – drums
 Alex MacDougall – drums, percussion
 Sarah Finch – backing vocals
 Steve Scott – augmented jungle chanting on "Bad Fruit"

Production 
 Produced and Arranged by Larry Norman, a Solid Rock Studios production.
 Ken Suesov – engineer and mixdowns
 Andy Johns – additional engineering and olfactory dismemberment (also known as Andrew "Just-like-that" Johns)
 Photography, album design, artwork, sandwiches and kitchen sink by Larry Norman, D.R.R.
 Paste-up and doo-wops – Little Bobby Emmons

References

1980 albums
Randy Stonehill albums